Adil Barbari (born 27 May 1993) is an Algerian former professional racing cyclist.

Major results

2011
 4th Overall Mazandaran Tour
1st Stage 2
2012
 1st Time trial, Arab Clubs Road Championships
 Tour du Faso
1st Stages 9 & 10
 African Road Championships
3rd  Team time trial
4th Time trial
2013
 National Road Championships
1st  Time trial
1st  Under-23 time trial
 Tour du Faso
1st Stages 4 & 8
 African Road Championships
2nd  Team time trial
4th Time trial
 6th Circuit d'Alger
 7th Time trial, Mediterranean Games
 7th Overall Tour de Gironde
2014
 National Road Championships
1st  Under-23 road race
2nd Time trial
4th Road race
 1st Grand Prix d'Oran
 1st Stage 1 Tour d'Algérie
 6th Circuit d'Alger
2015
 National Road Championships
1st  Under-23 time trial
2nd Time trial
 2nd Overall Tour de Blida
1st Stage 2
 African Games
3rd  Road race
3rd  Time trial
 3rd  Time trial, African Under-23 Road Championships
 3rd Overall Tour d'Oranie
1st Young rider classification
 4th Circuit de Constantine
2016
 1st Critérium International de Sétif
 2nd Time trial, National Road Championships
 2nd Overall Tour d'Annaba
1st Points classification
1st Stages 1 & 3
 2nd Overall Tour International de Sétif
1st Stage 3
 3rd Grand Prix d'Oran
 4th Overall Tour de Constantine
1st Points classification
1st Stages 1 & 3
 4th Overall Tour de Blida
1st Stage 2
 5th Time trial, African Road Championships
 6th Critérium International de Blida
 6th Critérium International d'Alger
 8th Circuit de Constantine

References

External links

1993 births
Living people
Algerian male cyclists
People from Biskra Province
African Games bronze medalists for Algeria
African Games medalists in cycling
Competitors at the 2015 African Games
Competitors at the 2013 Mediterranean Games
Mediterranean Games competitors for Algeria
21st-century Algerian people
20th-century Algerian people